The Mercedes-Benz Arocs is a heavy-duty truck, introduced by Mercedes-Benz in 2013.

Construction
The Mercedes-Benz Arocs is aimed at the construction sector; available bodies include dump-trucks, concrete mixers, and tractors, with two, three, or four axles. The Arocs has two main variants – the "Loader" and the "Grounder". The latter is a heavy-duty variant, with thicker  frame rails.

Engines NO position
All engines are Euro VI compliant:
 OM471
 OM470
 OM936

Lego Technic model
Lego released the Mercedes-Benz Arocs 3245 as a Lego Technic model with power functions in 2015. The set included working outriggers, dump bed and pneumatic crane. The set had 2793 parts and was the flagship Lego Technic set of 2015.

References

See also

List of Mercedes-Benz trucks
List of Mercedes-Benz vehicles

Arocs
Vehicles introduced in 2013
Cab over vehicles
Six-wheeled vehicles
Eight-wheeled vehicles